On Your Wedding Day is a 2018 South Korean romantic comedy film that depicts the ten-year love and friendship of two people from teenage to adulthood. It was written and directed by Lee Seok-geun, and stars Park Bo-young and Kim Young-kwang. The film was released on August 22, 2018.

Synopsis
A man receives a wedding invitation from his first love whom he met in high school. He reminisces all the trouble he went through to get together with her over the span of years beginning from youth, and how they had ups and downs in their life together. He finally goes to her wedding, and thanks her for being the shining star in his life and she thanks him for his support in need. He then walks away from her wedding function.

Cast

Main
 Park Bo-young as Hwan Seung-hee, a girl who believes in true love at first sight
 Kim Young-kwang as Hwang Woo-yeon, Seung-hee's high school friend who falls in love with her at first sight and believes her to be his destiny

Supporting
 Kang Ki-young as Ok Geun-nam, Woo-yeon's friend
 Ko Kyu-pil as Goo Gong-ja, Woo-yeon's friend
 Jang Sung-bum as Choi Su-pyo, Woo-yeon's friend
 Cha Yup as Lee Taek-gi
 Seo Eun-soo as Park Min-kyung, Woo-yeon's ex-girlfriend
 Bae Hae-sun as Seung-hee's mother
 Jeon Bae-soo as Seung-hee's father
 Seo Yoon-ah as Su-pyo's wife
 Kim Sung-bum as Men's wear floor salesperson
 Yoo Hee-je as Taek-gi's crew
 Yoon Kyung-ho as Police station detective
 Baek Seung-chul as Chief of the police station
 Ahn Min-young as Guest house owner
 Jang Da-kyung as Photographer
 Han Chul-woo as Broadcasting producer

Cameo and special appearances
 Ahn Gil-kang as Woo-yeon's father
 So Hee-jung as Woo-yeon's mother
 Kim Hyun-sook as Ms. Min
 Im Hyung-joon as Mr. Bae
 Ha Jun as Seung-hee's groom
 Song Jae-rim as Lee Yoon-geun, Seung-hee's college senior and ex-boyfriend
 Shin So-yul as Kim So-jung, Seung-hee's college friend

Production
 Pre-production started in 2015 and Kang Ha-neul was first offered the male lead role but ultimately declined.
 Lead actors Park Bo-young and Kim Young-kwang previously worked together in 2014 film Hot Young Bloods.
 Filming started on September 18, 2017, and completed on December 3.

Release
The film was released in South Korea on August 22, 2018.

International release
 In USA on August 31, 2018
 In Vietnam on September 7, 2018, under the title 
 In Taiwan on September 14, 2018, under the title 
 In Philippines on September 19, 2018
 In Singapore on September 20, 2018
 In Indonesia on October 3, 2018
 In Hong Kong on November 1, 2018, under the title 
 In Japan on March 1, 2019, under the title

Home media
The film was released in VOD service and digital download on September 27, 2018.

Reception

Critical response
The Korea Herald described the film as a "funny, cute, lighthearted, and leaving you reminiscent of how it used to be when you were younger", and that it "created likeable characters... everyone in the movie perfectly fits his or her part."

William Schwartz from HanCinema commented that it is "an all-around excellent movie", and wrote that the film "chronicles their love story through 2005 and 2007 and 2012, before finally ending on a twist in 2018. It is a marathon. Any of the four different eras could be a fully-fledged movie on its own. They all have strong, engaging story-lines."

Local online entertainment media TV Report remarked that On Your Wedding Day is "emerging as the dark horse of theater's summer season." It reported that the film attracts audience in all ages—teenagers, 20s, 30s and middle-age—as it depicts a chronicle of real first love; showed realistic stories and various emotions in the changing environment; and sympathized with the memories of youth.

Online magazine Cosmopolitan Philippines commented that the film "served important life and love lessons without being too cheesy or unrealistic." The reviewer also praised the lead stars' acting performance and their on-screen chemistry.

Box office
The film premiered in South Korean cinemas on August 22, 2018. It attracted 99,318 moviegoers on its opening day and finished first place with  gross, slightly higher than The Witness which finished in second place. It topped the box office during its first weekend with 30% revenue share, by attracting 694,237 moviegoers and grossing . After topping the box office for six consecutive days, the film reached 1 million admissions on August 27, 2018. On August 31, it reached its break-even point with 1.5 million of admissions, as result of a strong ten days box office performance.

During its second weekend, it remained on the top of the box office by having 568,267 attendance with  gross, 18.6% lower gross compared to its debut weekend. On September 3, 2018, it surpassed 2 million cumulative admissions. After a two weeks strong performance, the film fell to second place during its third weekend with  gross from 321,342 attendance, tailing Searching. On September 12, 2018, the film reached 2.6 million views and became the most watched romance film in South Korea in 2018, surpassing Be with You.

As of September 24, 2018, the film attracted 2,812,135 total admission with  gross.

Awards and nominations

Remake and adaptation
Chinese remake of the film titled My Love was released on April 30, 2021. It is directed and co-written by Han Tian, and stars Greg Hsu and Zhang Ruonan.

On June 23, 2021, it was announced that On Your Wedding Day will be adapted into a webtoon. It will be serialized on webtoon platforms such as Naver and Kakao.

References

External links
 
 
 

2018 films
2010s Korean-language films
South Korean films remade in other languages
South Korean romantic comedy films
2018 romantic comedy films
Films about weddings
2018 directorial debut films
2010s South Korean films